Fernand Arnout (8 December 1899 – 30 January 1974) was a French weightlifter. He competed in the 1920 Summer Olympics and in the 1928 Summer Olympics.

In 1920, he finished fifth in the lightweight class. Eight years later at the 1928 Games, Arnout won the bronze medal in the lightweight class.

References

External links
 
 

1899 births
1974 deaths
French male weightlifters
Olympic weightlifters of France
Olympic bronze medalists for France
Olympic medalists in weightlifting
Weightlifters at the 1920 Summer Olympics
Weightlifters at the 1928 Summer Olympics
Medalists at the 1928 Summer Olympics
20th-century French people